Schistura kodaguensis is a species of ray-finned fish, a stone loach, in the genus Schistura. This species has been recorded from a single stream with a swift current and gravel bottom in the Cauvery River system in Karnataka, India. The specific name is derived from Kodagu District where the type specimen was collected.

References

K
Cyprinid fish of Asia
Freshwater fish of India
Endemic fauna of the Western Ghats
Fish described in 1987
Taxobox binomials not recognized by IUCN